Monstrum may refer to:

 Latin monstrum, an unnatural portent and the origin of the English word monster
 Monstrum (film), a 2018 Korean film
 Vriesea monstrum, a bromeliad plant species
 AZX-Monstrum, a computer project
 Monstrum, a 2015 survival horror video game published by Soedesco
 Monstrum, a novel by Donald James
 "Monstrum", a short story by J. N. Williamson
 An element in the game Tomb Raider: The Angel of Darkness